Yu Song (Simplified Chinese:, born 6 August 1986) is a Chinese judoka. Competing in the over 78 kg category she won the world title in 2015 and an Olympics bronze medal in 2016. Yu is married to Zhang Maohong.

References

External links
 

1986 births
Living people
Olympic judoka of China
Judoka at the 2016 Summer Olympics
2016 Olympic bronze medalists for China
Olympic medalists in judo
Sportspeople from Qingdao
Chinese female judoka
Universiade medalists in judo
World judo champions
Universiade silver medalists for China
Medalists at the 2011 Summer Universiade
21st-century Chinese women